Stalbridge railway station was a station in Stalbridge in the county of Dorset, England. It was located on the Somerset and Dorset Joint Railway.  Sited on a single line stretch, the station had a passing loop with a station building on the down side. The goods yard and adjacent level crossing were controlled from a signal box.

History

The station was opened on 31 August 1863 by the London and South Western Railway as part of the Dorset Central Railway. The station was part of the Southern Region of British Railways when the railways were nationalised in 1948. The station was closed when the S&DJR closed on 7 March 1966.

The site today
Today the site is a trading estate and only some rails embedded in the road show the station was there.

Further reading 

  
   ISBN(no ISBN)

External links
 http://www.sdjr.net/locations/stalbridge.html
Station on navigable O.S. map

Disused railway stations in Dorset
Former Somerset and Dorset Joint Railway stations
Railway stations in Great Britain opened in 1863
Railway stations in Great Britain closed in 1966
Beeching closures in England
Stalbridge